FK Proleter may refer to various football clubs from the Balkans:

FK Proleter, defunct football club (1947-2005) from Zrenjanin, Serbia
FK Proleter, football club from Novi Sad, Serbia
FK Proleter, football club from Dvorovi near Bijeljina, Republika Srpska, Bosnia and Herzegovina
FK Proleter, football club from Teslić, Republika Srpska, Bosnia and Herzegovina

All of this clubs were established by communist Yugoslav authorities shortly after the end of World War II.